David Maraniss (born 1949) is an American journalist and author, currently serving as an associate editor for The Washington Post.

Career
The Washington Post assigned Maraniss the job of biographer for their coverage of 2008 presidential candidate Barack Obama.

In 2014, Maraniss was quoted in the "Mystery Document" segment of the educational YouTube video, "Crash Course: US History #44; George H.W. Bush and the end of the Cold War"

Personal life
Maraniss and wife Linda live in Washington, D.C. and Madison, Wisconsin. His son, Andrew Maraniss is also an author and was on the New York Times bestseller list in 2015.

Books
Maraniss has written or co-authored numerous books, most of which are biographies of politicians or athletes, and all of which were published by Simon & Schuster.

References

External links

 Official website

1949 births
American male journalists
American sportswriters
American non-fiction writers
Living people
Writers from Madison, Wisconsin
Pulitzer Prize for National Reporting winners
The Washington Post people
20th-century American journalists